This is a chronological list of films and television shows that have been shot at any of the studios that have existed at the site adjacent to Clarendon Road, Borehamwood, England, since 1984 known as BBC Elstree Centre. The site is now also adjacent to Eldon Avenue which did not exist when the site first opened as a film studio in 1914, and was the first of several sites collectively known as "Elstree Studios". 

In 1960 the flim studios were converted to television studios used by the former ITV contractor ATV and, since 1984, by the BBC.

Neptune Film Studios (1914–17)
The Neptune Film Company opened the first studios in Borehamwood in 1914. All films listed below were silent movies produced by the company, and it is assumed they were shot at the company's studios.

Ideal Film Studios (1917–24)
The Ideal Film Company bought the studios in 1917. All films listed below were silent movies produced by the company between 1917 and 1924. It is assumed they were shot at the company's studios, although it is possible that a small number were shot elsewhere.

Blattner Studios (1928–34)
In 1928, the studios were sold to Ludwig Blattner, who installed sound recording equipment. The following films were shot at the studios.

Rock Studios (1934–39)
In 1934, the studios were leased to Joe Rock Productions, who bought them in 1936, and added four large stages, including the "C" and "D" stages that are still in use today. The following films were shot at Rock Studios.

British National Studios (1939–53)
The studios were bought by the British National Films Company in 1939. All films listed below were produced by the company, except those indicated otherwise.

National Studios (1953–58)
In 1953, the studios were bought by Douglas Fairbanks, Jr.

 Douglas Fairbanks Presents 
 The Count of Monte Cristo (later episodes)

ATV Elstree Studios (1958–84)
The studios that the ITV contractor ATV bought in 1958 were film studios and the first TV shows made here were shot on film.

 The Adventures of William Tell 
 H.G. Wells' Invisible Man 

During 1960–1961, all the soundstages were converted to video TV studios.  All shows listed below were video productions by ATV for ITV unless indicated otherwise.

BBC Elstree Centre (1984–present)
The BBC bought the studios in 1984. At first the studios were used for BBC shows only, but later they became available for hire by other production companies and broadcasters. Today they are run by BBC Studioworks. 
 

 The Tripods  
 EastEnders 
 Grange Hill 
 The Tale of the Bunny Picnic 
 'Allo 'Allo! 
 Going for Gold 
 Newsroom South East 
 Opportunity Knocks 
 You Rang, M'Lord? 
 Big Break 
 Top of the Pops 
 Hangar 17 
 Incredible Games 
 Kilroy 
 Holby City 
 Tikkabilla 
 Bamzooki 
 Show Me Show Me 
 Relic: Guardians of the Museum 
 Odd One In 
 Rock & Chips 
 Sadie J 
 A League of Their Own 
 The IT Crowd 
 That Puppet Game Show 
 Children in Need 
 Fake Reaction 
 Live at the Electric 
 Keep It in the Family 
 Celebrity Juice 
 Goodness Gracious Me 
 Tenable 
 Lip Sync Battle UK 
 Let's Sing and Dance 
 Not Going Out 
 Play to the Whistle 
 Room 101 
 Sam Smith at the BBC 
 Dara O Briain's Go 8 Bit 
 The Big Fat Quiz of the Year 
 Celebrity Game Night 
 Through the Keyhole 
 Blockbusters 
 8 Out of 10 Cats 
 The Ranganation 
 The Jonathan Ross Show 
 Comic Relief 
 Take Off with Bradley & Holly 
 Crazy Delicious 
 Kate & Koji

See also
 :Category:Films shot at Rock Studios (1928–1939)
 :Category:Films shot at British National Studios (1939–1958)
 :Category:Television shows shot at British National Studios (before 1958)
 :Category:Television shows shot at ATV Elstree Studios (1958–1983)
 :Category:Television shows shot at BBC Elstree Centre (since 1984)
 Chronological lists of productions shot at the other Elstree studios:
 List of films and television shows shot at Elstree Studios
 
 
 List of films shot at MGM-British Studios, Elstree

References

 List of films and television shows shot at Eldon Avenue Studios, Elstree
Eldon Avenue Studios, Elstree
Eldon Avenue Studios, Elstree
 List of films and television shows shot at Eldon Avenue Studios, Elstree
 List of films and television shows shot at Eldon Avenue Studios, Elstree
 List of films and television shows shot at Eldon Avenue Studios, Elstree
 List of films and television shows shot at Eldon Avenue Studios, Elstree